Ścigów  (German: Schiegau) is a village in the administrative district of Gmina Strzeleczki, within Krapkowice County, Opole Voivodeship, in south-western Poland.

Location

History

References

Villages in Krapkowice County